Katalin Povázsán (born 2 August 1960) is a Hungarian sprint canoeist who competed in the 1980s. She won five medals at the ICF Canoe Sprint World Championships with a gold (K-2 500 m: 1986), three silvers (K-2 500 m: 1982, 1983; K-4 500 m: 1987), and a bronze (K-4 500 m: 1982).

Povázsán also finished seventh in the K-1 500 m event at the 1980 Summer Olympics in Moscow.

References

1960 births
Canoeists at the 1980 Summer Olympics
Hungarian female canoeists
Living people
Olympic canoeists of Hungary
ICF Canoe Sprint World Championships medalists in kayak